Sadovaya is a station on the Frunzensko-Primorskaya Line of Saint Petersburg Metro, opened on 30 December 1991. It provides a transfer to the Pravoberezhnaya line through Spasskaya and the Moskovsko-Petrogradskaya line through Sennaya Ploshchad.

Transport 
Buses: 49, 50, 70, 71, 181, 262. Trams: 3.

Saint Petersburg Metro stations
Railway stations in Russia opened in 1991
Railway stations located underground in Russia